The great antpitta (Grallaria excelsa) is a species of bird in the family Grallariidae. It is endemic to Venezuela. Its natural habitat is subtropical or tropical moist montane forest. It is threatened by habitat loss.

References

External links
BirdLife Species Factsheet. 
Stamps (for Venezuela) with RangeMap

great antpitta
Birds of the Venezuelan Andes
Endemic birds of Venezuela
great antpitta
Taxonomy articles created by Polbot